(b. 1958) is a blind Japanese computer scientist, known for her work at IBM Research – Tokyo in accessibility. A Netscape browser plug-in she developed, the IBM Home Page Reader, became the most widely used web-to-speech system available. She is the recipient of numerous industry and government awards.

Education and career
Asakawa was born with normal sight, but after she injured her optic nerve when she hit her left eye on the side of a swimming pool at age 11, she began losing her sight, and by age 14 she was fully blind. She earned a bachelor's degree in English literature at Otemon Gakuin University in Osaka in 1982 and then began a two-year computer programming course for blind people using an Optacon to translate print to tactile sensation. She joined IBM Research with a temporary position in 1984, and became a permanent staff researcher there one year later. In 2004 she earned a Ph.D. in engineering from the University of Tokyo.

Contributions
Asakawa's research projects have included developing a word processor for Braille documents, developing a digital library for Braille documents, developing an application to improve accessibility of streaming services, developing a Netscape browser plug-in that converted text to speech and provided a more convenient web navigation mechanism for blind people, and developing a system that would allow sighted web designers to experience the web as blind people. Her browser plugin became a 1997 IBM product, the IBM Home Page Reader, and within five years it had become the most widely used web-to-speech system available.

More recently her work has also studied accessible control of multimedia content, technological and social changes that would allow elderly people to work for more years before retiring, and the development of technology that would make the physical world more accessible to blind people. Currently, Asakawa has finished working on a lightweight suitcase robot helping blind people navigate through complicated terrain.

Awards and honors
Asakawa was added to the Women in Technology International Hall of Fame in 2003.
She became an IBM Fellow, IBM's top honor for its employees, in 2009, becoming the fifth Japanese person and first Japanese woman with that honor. In 2011 the Anita Borg Institute for Women and Technology gave her their Women of Vision Award. She was a keynote speaker at the Fourth International Conference on Software Development for Enhancing Accessibility and Fighting Info-exclusion (DSAIE 2012). In 2013 the Japanese government awarded her their Medal of Honor with Purple Ribbon. A paper she wrote in 1998 with Takashi Itoh describing their work on web user interfaces for blind people was the winner of the 2013 ACM SIGACCESS Impact Award.
In 2017, she was elected as an international member of the US National Academy of Engineering for developing technologies for the visually impaired to access digital information.

References

External links
 IBM employee profile
 

Living people
Japanese computer scientists
Japanese women computer scientists
IBM Fellows
Blind academics
Japanese blind people
University of Tokyo alumni
Recipients of the Medal with Purple Ribbon
Foreign associates of the National Academy of Engineering
People from Osaka
20th-century Japanese engineers
20th-century women engineers
21st-century Japanese engineers
21st-century women engineers
Year of birth missing (living people)
Scientists with disabilities